Janet Angel MacLachlan (August 27, 1933 – October 11, 2010) was an American actress who had roles in such television series as The Rockford Files, Alias,All In The family and The Golden Girls. She is best remembered for her key supporting part in the film Sounder (1972) where she portrayed Camille Johnson a young teacher. MacLachlan worked with numerous well-known actors and actresses and celebrities such as Bill Cosby, Jim Brown, James Earl Jones, Maya Angelou and Morgan Freeman.

Life and career
MacLachlan was born in Harlem, New York City; her mother, Iris South MacLachlan, and father, James MacLachlan, were both Jamaican-born members of the Church of the Illumination. Attending P.S. 170 and Julia Ward Junior High School, MacLachlan graduated from Julia Richmond High School in 1950. She received a bachelor's degree in psychology from Hunter College in 1955. She then worked as an executive secretary in New York City before turning to acting. She later performed at the Tyrone Guthrie Theatre in Minneapolis.

A one-time contract player for Universal Studios, MacLachlan made her debut in two episodes of The Alfred Hitchcock Hour in 1965. She appeared in episodes of The Fugitive, The Invaders episode "The Vise" as Mrs Baxter (1968), The Girl from U.N.C.L.E., Star Trek, Ironside, The Mary Tyler Moore Show, Wonder Woman and The Mod Squad. She also appeared in the films Uptight (1968), Change of Mind (1969), ...tick...tick...tick... (1970), Darker Than Amber (1970), Halls of Anger (1970), Sounder (1972), The Man (1972), Tightrope (1984), Murphy's Law (1986), The Boy Who Could Fly (1986) and The Thirteenth Floor (1999). 
 
MacLachlan also won a Los Angeles-area Emmy for her performance in KCET's Voices of Our People: In Celebration of Black Poetry in 1981. She would later serve as grant committee chairman for the Academy of Motion Picture Arts and Sciences.

Death
Suffering from cardiovascular disease in her later years, MacLachlan died from complications from the condition on October 11, 2010, at the age of 77 at Kaiser Permanente Medical Center in Los Angeles. MacLachlan resided in the Silver Lake neighborhood of Los Angeles.

Filmography

References

External links

1933 births
2010 deaths
Actresses from New York City
African-American actresses
American film actresses
American people of Jamaican descent
American television actresses
Hunter College alumni
20th-century American actresses
21st-century American actresses
20th-century African-American women
20th-century African-American people
21st-century African-American women
21st-century African-American people